Sylviornis, also known by its native name of Du, is an extinct genus of large, flightless bird that was endemic to the islands of New Caledonia in the Western Pacific. It is considered to constitute one of two genera in the extinct family Sylviornithidae, alongside Megavitiornis from Fiji, which are related to the Galliformes, the group containing the turkeys, chickens, quails and pheasants. Sylviornis was never encountered alive by scientists, but it is known from many thousands of subfossil bones found in deposits, some of them from the Holocene, on New Caledonia and the adjacent Île des Pins. It was likely hunted to extinction shortly after the first human arrival to New Caledonia around 1500 BC.

Description

It is the most massive galliform known to have ever existed. It had a large skull with a high and laterally compressed beak surmounted by a bony knob. Its legs were rather short, but had strong toes with long nails. The skeleton has a number of peculiarities and differences that make Sylviornis stand apart from all other known birds: the clavicles were not fused to a furcula, the number of caudal vertebrae was very high, and the ribcage and pelvis were almost dinosaurian in appearance. The wings were reduced to small stubs.

Behaviour
A large proportion—up to 50% in some deposits—of the remains found were from juvenile animals. Thus, it has been theorized that Sylviornis had a clutch of at least two, more probably closer to 10 eggs, and that the average lifespan was not much more than 5–7 years, which would be extremely low for such a large bird. It was thought that the bird did not incubate its eggs but built a mound similar to the megapodes. Tumuli on the Île des Pins which were initially believed to be graves were found to contain no human remains or grave goods, and it has been hypothesized that they were in reality the incubation mounds of Sylviornis.

However, recent assessment of this bird as outside and not even particularly closely related to megapodes make the possibility that it was a mound-builder like them strictly unlikely.

Ecology
Little can be said about the lifestyle of Sylviornis. It was probably a slow-moving browser, and the structure of the bill and feet suggest that roots and tubers it dug up formed a major part of its diet.

Extinction
The bird was hunted to extinction by the Lapita ancestors of the Kanak people, who settled New Caledonia around 1500 BC. Predation by feral dogs and pigs probably also played a part. The legacy of Sylviornis persists in Kanak oral history in the form of stories giving a rough description of the bird and some of its habits.

See also

 Biodiversity of New Caledonia
 Holocene extinction
 Island gigantism
 Late Quaternary prehistoric birds

References

External links
Article with reconstruction pictures of Sylviornis

Galliformes
Extinct flightless birds
Prehistoric bird genera
Extinct monotypic bird genera
Late Quaternary prehistoric birds
New Caledonia Holocene fauna
Holocene extinctions
Extinct birds of New Caledonia
Fossil taxa described in 1980